Subic Broadcasting Corporation is a Philippine media network. Its corporate office is located at the 5th Floor, Admiral Royale Hotel, 17th St. cor. Anonas St., Brgy. West Bajac-Bajac, Olongapo.

Profile
SBC was first founded on July 29, 1969, with its AM station DWGO "Radio on the Go" under 1557 kHz. After being temporarily closed during martial law in 1972, it resumed operation in 1976, this time on 1008 kHz. SBC soon acquired a franchise for radio and television operation, establishing the first & only television station in January 2011, TV 22. In the early half of the year 2013, SBC partnered with TV5 to better serve the viewing public of Olongapo, Zambales, Bataan, and neighboring areas.

Stations
Source:

AM Stations

FM Stations

TV Stations

References

Mass media companies of the Philippines
Mass media in Olongapo
Companies based in Olongapo
Television networks in the Philippines
Privately held companies